Hula Lula (real name Claudia BoBadia; born 20 August 1973, in Tegernsee) is a German singer, photographer and music manager who currently lives in Berlin.

Biography 
Lula has worked frequently together with Bela B. Their first co-operation came on the duet "Leave". The song was featured in the Austrian movie Bloody Weekend and was released as a single on East West Records in 2001. For a KLF tribute sampler, Lula once again sang a duet with Bela B. on a cover version of ″Justified and Ancient″. The song was produced by Wayne Jackson and Olsen Involtini. Lula′s songwriting qualities were featured on Bela B.'s solo album Bingo where she also sang a further duet called „Hab keine Angst" (Have No Fear).

In 2006, Lula signed to BPX1992, the same label which released Bingo. Her debut solo album Lost in Reverie was recorded and produced by Wayne Jackson. Changes at the label meant the album was never officially released. It features another collaboration with Bela B on the track "I Want".  ″Come Along″, another track from this album, was featured in the German movie Vineta.

Lula also sang a duet with Lee Hazlewood. The song "Nothing" where Lula sings in German and Hazlewood in English appears on Hazlewood's final album Cake or Death.

Singles

External links 
 Official website as a photographer

German women singers
1973 births
Living people
21st-century German women singers